Hank Mobley Quartet is the debut album by jazz saxophonist Hank Mobley released on the Blue Note label in 1955 as BLP 5066, a 10" LP. It was recorded on March 27, 1955, and features Mobley, Horace Silver, Doug Watkins and Art Blakey. The album was released on CD only in Japan, as a limited edition.

Reception
The Allmusic review by Ron Wynn awarded the album 4 stars, stating: "This debut of Mobley on Blue Note includes Horace Silver on piano and Doug Watkins on bass, plus someone named Art Blakey on drums."

Track listing 
All compositions by Hank Mobley, except as indicated.
 "Hank's Prank" - 4:31
 "My Sin" - 3:50
 "Avila and Tequila" -	4:31
 "Walkin' the Fence" - 3:38
 "Love for Sale" (Porter) - 4:31
 "Just Coolin'" - 4:10

Personnel 
 Hank Mobley - tenor saxophone
 Horace Silver - piano
 Doug Watkins - bass
 Art Blakey - drums

References

1955 albums
Albums produced by Alfred Lion
Albums recorded at Van Gelder Studio
Blue Note Records albums
Hank Mobley albums
Hard bop albums